Ani Palian is a Ukrainian Paralympic swimmer.

Career

Palian has cerebral palsy and competes in S7 classification races.

She competed at the 2012 Paralympic Games where she won a bronze medal in the 50 metre freestyle S7 event.

She competed for Ukraine at the World Para Swimming Championships in 2010, where she won a gold medal in the 4x50 metre freestyle event, and in 2013, where she won a gold medal in the 4x50 metre freestyle relay event and bronze medals in the 400 metre freestyle S7 and 100 metre freestyle S7 events. She competed for Russia in 2015 and won a gold medal in the 50 metre freestyle S7 event, a silver medal in the 100 metre freestyle S7 event and bronze medals in the 400 metre freestyle S7, 4x50 metre freestyle and 4x100 metre medley relay events.

She also competed at the World Para Swimming European Championships in 2011, where she won a bronze medal in the 400m freestyle S7 event.

She was awarded with the Order of Princess Olga, third class, for her performance at the 2012 Paralympic Games.

In 2015, she began representing Russia in international competitions.

References

Year of birth missing (living people)
Living people
Ukrainian female freestyle swimmers
S7-classified Paralympic swimmers
Paralympic swimmers of Ukraine
Paralympic bronze medalists for Ukraine
Paralympic medalists in swimming
Swimmers at the 2012 Summer Paralympics
Swimmers at the 2020 Summer Paralympics
Medalists at the World Para Swimming Championships
Medalists at the World Para Swimming European Championships
Recipients of the Order of Princess Olga, 3rd class
Swimmers with cerebral palsy
Medalists at the 2012 Summer Paralympics
Medalists at the 2020 Summer Paralympics
Paralympic silver medalists for the Russian Paralympic Committee athletes